Poinciana is a settlement and census-designated place (CDP) in Osceola and Polk counties in the U.S. state of Florida. As of the 2010 United States Census, the CDP had a population of 53,193.

As of April 2012 the population of the 9 villages which make up the Association of Poinciana Villages (APV), which covers a wider area than the CDP, was reported as 69,857. According to the latest census reports the adjoining tracts outside the CDP represent an additional 29,914 persons. Depending on the definition, the greater Poinciana Area represents a population of between 53,193 and 83,107. This puts Poinciana as one of the fastest growth areas for Central Florida over the past decade.

Transportation

U.S. Highway 17/92 (here part of the Orange Blossom Trail) runs through the north of Poinciana.  The Poinciana Parkway (State Road 538), a toll road to connect Poinciana more directly to Interstate 4, was opened on April 30, 2016.

Poinciana is the southern terminus of the SunRail system. SunRail's Poinciana station is located in the north of Poinciana near the intersection of Orange Blossom Trail (aka U.S. Highway 17/92) and Poinciana Boulevard, and opened on July 30, 2018.  Local bus service is provided from central areas of Poinciana to Kissimmee and Haines City by the Lynx network.

Geography

Subdivisions 
Poinciana was planned as a Planned Unit Development (PUD). Most of the PUD was developed in 10 Villages with each being their own sub association and corporation duly recorded with the State of Florida Corporation, which form the Association of Poinciana Villages (APV) Master Association. Four of the villages are in Osceola County (Village 1 with Cypress Woods and Stepping Stone, Villages 2, 5 and Village 9 (Broadmoor - mobile home park) and six Villages 3, 4, 6, 7 and 8) are in Polk County.  Located on approximately 47,000 acres (190 km), the sub-villages are their own association under a deed-restricted community, governed by a Master homeowner association, the APV. Solivita is no longer under the APV Master Association (Village 10), it was removed by the APV Executive Committee on November 2, 2011, one of the Villages within Polk County, it is a 55+ gated community. and comprises two Community Development Districts, Poinciana CDD and Poinciana West CDD.

Neighbor subdivisions such as Waterford, Little Creek, Brighton Lakes, Oak Hammock Preserve, Crescent Lakes, Trafalgar, Doral, Isles of Bellalago, Cypress Cove, Deerwood, Wilderness, Bellalago, etc. are outside the CDP. Many of these subdivisions were defined in the original Poinciana boundary PUD but some were later developed as separate communities outside the APV.

History 
Poinciana was planned in the 1960s. The original developer was Gulf American Corporation. Poinciana was conceived as a retirement destination, and the first homes were built in 1973 around the Poinciana Golf and Racquet Club. Since the mid-1980s the developer has been AV Homes (formerly Avatar Holdings).  By 1994 the population had only risen to about 8,000, but since then growth has been rapid. By June 7, 2018, Taylor Morrison Homes, Inc announces its agreement to Acquire AV Homes, Inc at $21.90 per share.

Notable person

Pro wrestler Rikishi resides in Poinciana.

Demographics

As of the census of 2010 there were 53,193 residing in the CDP. The racial makeup of the CDP was 22.6% White non-Hispanic, 21.3% African American, 0.2% Native American, 1.7% Asian, 0.20% Pacific Islander, 0.7% from other races, and 2.2% from two or more races. Hispanic or Latino of any race were 51.2% of the population.

In addition there were 29,914 residing in the non-CDP neighborhoods. Poinciana is 35.8% Puerto Rican and is considered a "Little Puerto Rico" in Florida.

For census 2000 there were 4,153 households, out of which 50.3% had children under the age of 18 living with them, 65.5% were married couples living together, 15.4% had a female householder with no husband present, and 14.2% were non-families. 10.5% of all households were made up of individuals, and 3.7% had someone living alone who was 65 years of age or older. The average household size was 3.29 and the average family size was 3.49. This information will be updated for census 2010 when it becomes available.

In the 2010 Census CDP the population was spread out, with 29.27% under the age of 18, and 70.73% age 18 and over. The non CDP population was 27.4% under age of 18 and 72.6% over.

In 2000 the median income for a household in the CDP was $37,172, and the median income for a family was $37,688. Males had a median income of $26,860 versus $20,934 for females. The per capita income for the CDP was $12,590. About 12.0% of families and 12.8% of the population were below the poverty line, including 17.9% of those under age 18 and 12.3% of those age 65 or over. Likewise, 2010 income information will be updated when it become available.

Education
 Osceola County
 Pre-Kindergarten Schools
 Liberty High School (Pre-K)
 Poinciana 247 Pre-K & V.P.K. (Private School)
 Poinciana Christian Preparatory School (K-12) (Private School)
 Reedy Creek Elementary (Pre-K)
 Elementary Schools
 Bellalago Academy (K-8) (District managed charter school)
 Renaissance Charter School at Poinciana (K-8)
 Chestnut Elementary (CES)
 Deerwood Elementary (DWE)
 Koa Elementary
 Poinciana Academy Of Fine Arts (PAFA)
 Reedy Creek Elementary (RCES)
 Mater Brighton Lakes Academy
 Middle Schools
 Bellalago Academy
 Discovery Intermediate (DIS)
 Horizon Middle (HMS)
 Mater Brighton Lakes Academy (MBLA)
 High Schools
 Poinciana High School (PHS)
 New Dimensions (NDHS) (public charter high school)
 Liberty High School (LHS):
Post-secondary Schools
 Valencia College (Beginning Fall 2017)
 Polk County
 Elementary Schools
 Palmetto Elementary (pre Kindergarten-5th grade)
 Laurel Elementary (Up to 4th grade)
 Middle Schools
 Lake Marion Creek Middle School (6-8) (LMC)

Libraries 
 Poinciana Branch Library - Osceola library system

See also 
 Greater Orlando

References

External links
 Poinciana Florida
 Association of Poinciana Village
 Poinciana Pioneer

Census-designated places in Osceola County, Florida
Census-designated places in Polk County, Florida
Cities in the Greater Orlando
Census-designated places in Florida